Kahatjipara Barbara (born 1975 in Usakos, Namibia) is a Namibian fashion model and economics teacher.

She won the Miss Namibia beauty contest in 1993, and the Miss Universe Congeniality 1994 award as part of the Miss Universe 1994.

Barbara Kahatjipara completed also a BA degree in international politics at the University of Cape Town in South Africa and an MBA in "International Marketing" at the Fachhochschule Reutlingen in Germany and about 2008 she has been a research assistant  at the economics institute of the Polytechnic of Namibia in Windhoek. In 2020, she worked as an actress.

In the namibian city Karibib, a street was named after her.

References

1975 births
Living people
People from Windhoek
Namibian female models
Namibian educators
University of Cape Town alumni
Namibian expatriates in South Africa
Namibian expatriates in Germany
Miss Universe 1994 contestants
Miss World 1993 delegates